Agnieszka Radwańska was the defending champion, but she lost in the second round to Bethanie Mattek-Sands.

Tsvetana Pironkova won her maiden WTA title, defeating Angelique Kerber in the final, 6–4, 6–4.

Seeds
The top two seeds receive a bye into the second round.

Main draw

Finals

Top half

Bottom half

Qualifying

Seeds

Qualifiers

Lucky loser

Draw

First qualifier

Second qualifier

Third qualifier

Fourth qualifier

Fifth qualifier

Sixth qualifier

References
 Main Draw
 Qualifying Draw

W